The Paul Dejean Cup, also called Paul Dejean French Cup, is an annual rugby league knockout competition organised by the Fédération Française de Rugby à XIII for clubs in the National Division 1 competition.

List of finals

2008 competition

2007 competition

2006 competition

See also

Rugby league in France
French rugby league system
Lord Derby Cup
Coupe Georges-Aillères
Coupe Albert-Falcou

References

External links

Rugby league competitions in France